Bob Moon may refer to:

 Bob Moon (rugby league) (born 1933), Australia rugby league player 
 Bob Moon (scholar) (born 1945), British professor of education